Platon Oyunsky Yakutsk International Airport (Platon Ojuunuskaj aatynan aan dojdutaaghy Coquusqay Aeroport ; , Mezhdunarodnyj aeroport Yakutsk imeni Platona Ojunskogo)  is an airport in Yakutsk, Russia. It has one runway (an older runway serves as a parking area for disused aircraft) and has a capacity of 700 passengers per hour. The airport is the hub for five regional airlines, including Yakutia Airlines and Polar Airlines.

Construction of the airport started in 1931, and it was used as a stopover on the ALSIB Alaska-Siberia air route for American planes flying to Europe during World War II. The present international terminal was built in 1996. The airport serves as a diversion airport on Polar route 4.

The airport is used by Boeing to test cold weather starting of its aircraft.

Airlines and destinations

Accidents and incidents
Before 1992, Aeroflot had a monopoly on Soviet domestic flights, and had a lot of accidents. At least a dozen deadly accidents happened on or near Yakutsk. See Aeroflot accidents and incidents.

On 4 February 2010, Yakutia Airlines Flight 425, operated by Antonov An-24 RA-47360 suffered an engine failure on take-off for Olyokminsk Airport. During the subsequent landing, the nose and port main undercarriage were retracted, causing substantial damage to the aircraft.
On 10 October 2018, Flight 414, operated by a Sukhoi Superjet 100 RA-89011, rode out from a runway on landing at Yakutsk Airport from Ulan-Ude. During the subsequent landing, the behind chassis of the aircraft were broken. No one was killed in the crash, but four people were hospitalised.

References

External links
 Article on Yakutsk Airport
 Airport Yakutsk Aviateka.Handbook

1931 establishments in the Soviet Union
Airports built in the Soviet Union
Airports established in 1931
Airports in the Sakha Republic